Dreaming Creek may refer to:

Dreaming Creek (Kentucky), a stream in Madison County
Dreaming Creek (Virginia), a stream in Lynchburg